IEs4Linux is a free and open source script that allows a user to run Internet Explorer (IE) using Wine. It is possible to install Internet Explorer versions 5, 5.5, and 6, along with partial functionality of IE7 (the layout engine was loaded into the IE6 interface, which works well enough to demonstrate how the target page looks in IE7).

This application is oriented towards web developers: it allows users of non-Windows operating systems to view their web pages in a similar manner to how they look on Windows and user who need to use web applications targeted to IE users.

There was a blog post on January 5, 2011 announcing that the developers are now working to support IE9 and will soon release a new version after almost three years of inactivity, however there was never a new release.

Technical notes
Version 2.99.0.1 does not work out-of-the-box on newer Wine and KDE versions. The solution is to create a symlink with
    sudo ln -sv /usr/bin/winecfg /usr/bin/wineprefixcreate
and then run  with the  command line option.

Discontinuation
IEs4Linux has not received any updates in 14 years as of 2022, effectively rendering it abandonware.

Further reading
 David Pendell (September 18, 2008) IEs4Linux lets you install Internet Explorer under Linux, Linux.com
 Fernando Cassia, (September 26, 2006) "IE for Linux" hack offers one more reason not to boot Windows: First INQpressions Foolproof Wine installer script made in Brazil, The Inquirer
 Rickford Grant, Ubuntu for Non-Geeks: A Pain-Free, Project-Based, Get-Things-Done Guidebook, 3rd ed., No Starch Press, 2008, p. 169

Notes and references

External links
 
 Installation

Linux web browsers
Software derived from or incorporating Wine